Ray S. Jones III (born October 6, 1969) an American attorney and politician serving as the judge–executive of Pike County, Kentucky. He was previously a Democratic member of the Kentucky Senate, representing the 31st District from 2001 to 2019.

Early life and education
Jones was born in Whitesburg, Kentucky in 1969. He earned a Bachelor of Arts degree from Eastern Kentucky University in 1991 and a JD from the University of Louisville School of Law in 1994.

Career
Jones was first elected to the Kentucky Senate in 2000 for a term starting in 2001. Jones served on the Appropriations and Revenue, Transportation, Natural Resources and Energy, and Judiciary committees.
In 2018, Jones ran for and won the position of Pike County judge–executive, replacing the outgoing incumbent Bill Deskins. He was sworn in on January 6, 2019 and assumed office the following day.

References

External links
 Senate District 31: Senator Ray S. Jones II (D) at Kentucky Legislature
 Ray Jones II at Project Vote Smart
 Ray Jones at Ballotpedia

1969 births
21st-century American politicians
Baptists from Kentucky
Eastern Kentucky University alumni
Kentucky lawyers
Democratic Party Kentucky state senators
Living people
People from Whitesburg, Kentucky
University of Louisville School of Law alumni